was a Japanese voice actor who worked for 81 Produce.

Voice roles
Batman: The Animated Series (Rupert Thorne)
City Hunter (Mohammed (ep.2))
Detective Conan: Crossroad in the Ancient Capital (Seizo Sakura)
Fist of the North Star (Dragon, Katoujutsu Commander)
Guyver: The Bioboosted Armor (Hamilcar Barcas)
Legend of the Galactic Heroes (Glaeser (ep. 44))
Mobile Fighter G Gundam (Keiun)
Planetes (managing director (ep.8))
Starship Operators (Truman (ep.13))
Texhnolyze (Keitarou Mizuno)

External links
Saburo Kamei at 81 Produce 

Mention of Saburo Kamei's death 

1938 births
2013 deaths
81 Produce voice actors
Japanese male voice actors
20th-century Japanese male actors
21st-century Japanese male actors